Below is a list of beaches in the Brazilian state of Pernambuco by municipality, from the northernmost Carne de Vaca beach until Coroa Grande at the south end.

The Pernambuco coast has 187 kilometres (116 mi) long plus the Fernando de Noronha islands coast. In Pernambuco are located dozens of beaches of all types, from virgin to urban ones.

Goiana 
Carne de Vaca
Pontas de Pedras
Barra de Catuama
Catuama
Atapuz
Tabatinga

Itamaracá Islands 

Pontal da Ilha
Fortinho
Pontal de Jaguaribe
Jaguaribe

Quatro cantos
Pilar
Rio Âmbar
Baixa Verde
Forno de Cal
Forte Orange
Enseada dos Golfinhos

São Paulo
Sossego

Igarassu 
Gavoa
Coroa do Avião Islet
Mangue seco

Paulista 
Conceição 
Pau Amarelo
Janga
Maria Farinha

Olinda 
Rio Doce
Casa Caiada
Bairro Novo
Farol
Carmo
Milagres
Del Chifre

Recife 

Brasília Teimosa
Pina
Boa Viagem, Recife

Jaboatão 
Piedade
Candeias
Barra de Jangada

Cabo de Santo Agostinho 

Paiva
Itapuama
Xeréu
Enseada dos Corais
Gaibu
Calhetas
Paraiso
Suape

Ipojuca 

Camboa
Muro Alto
Cupé
Porto de Galinhas
Pontal de Maracaípe
Maracaípe
Serrambi

Sirinhaém 
Gamela
Guadalupe
Barra de Sirinhaém

Rio Formoso 
Pedra
Reduto

Tamandaré 

Boca da Barra
Campas
Tamandaré
Carneiros

Barreiros 
Porto
Mamucabinhas

São José da Coroa Grande 

 Gravatá
Barra da Cruz
Várzea do Una
Coroa Grande

Fernando de Noronha Islands 

Sancho
Conceição
Cacimba do Padre
Golfinhos bay
Porcos bay
Santo Antonio Port bay
Boldró
Americano
Bode
Biboca
Cachorro
Do Meio
Quixaba
Ponta da Sapata
Leão
Ponta das Caracas
Sueste bay
Atalaia
Enseada da Caeira
Buraco da Raquel
Caeira
Ponta da Air France

Gallery

References

Landforms of Pernambuco
Tourist attractions in Pernambuco
Lists of beaches in Brazil